Sir Charles Merrik Burrell, 3rd Baronet (24 May 1774 – 4 January 1862) was an English Conservative politician, who represented the seat of New Shoreham for fifty-six years, becoming Father of the House of Commons.

Burrell was born at Golden Square, London, the son of Sir William Burrell, 2nd Baronet  and his wife Sophia Raymond. He succeeded to the title of  Baronet Raymond of Valentine House on 20 January 1796. In 1806 he was elected as M.P. for New Shoreham  and he held the seat until his death in 1862.

Burrell built a country mansion near Knepp Castle, known by the same name, near West Grinstead and purchased an estate at  Boulton. He owned a house in Richmond Terrace, London which was the subject of a court case in 1833 in which he argued that because the house was on the site of the former Palace of Whitehall, it was not liable to the poor rate of St. Margaret's, Westminster.

Burrell married Frances Wyndham, the illegitimate daughter of George Wyndham, 3rd Earl of Egremont, and Elizabeth Ilive, on 4 July 1808 at St. George's Church, Hanover Square. Their eldest son Charles Wyndham Burrell died aged seventeen, but his other sons Percy and Walter succeeded successively to the baronetcy and the seat of New Shoreham.

References

External links 
 

|-

1774 births
1862 deaths
Baronets in the Baronetage of Great Britain
Charles
Conservative Party (UK) MPs for English constituencies
UK MPs 1806–1807
UK MPs 1807–1812
UK MPs 1812–1818
UK MPs 1818–1820
UK MPs 1820–1826
UK MPs 1826–1830
UK MPs 1830–1831
UK MPs 1831–1832
UK MPs 1832–1835
UK MPs 1835–1837
UK MPs 1837–1841
UK MPs 1841–1847
UK MPs 1847–1852
UK MPs 1852–1857
UK MPs 1857–1859
UK MPs 1859–1865
People from West Grinstead